Hugo Preuß Bridge (German: Hugo-Preuß-Brücke) is a bridge connecting Berlin-Mitte and Moabit in Berlin, Germany.

External links
 

Preuß
Mitte